Ludwig Christian Friedrich (von) Förster (8 October 1797 in Ansbach – 16 June 1863 in Bad Gleichenberg, Styria) was a German-born Austrian architect. While he was not Jewish, he is known for building Jewish synagogues and churches.

Ludwig Förster studied in Munich and Vienna. He founded the Allgemeine Bauzeitung in 1836. From 1842 to 1845 he taught at the Academy of Fine Arts Vienna and influenced a generation of Viennese architects through his architectural studio. 

From 1839/40 he worked as a freelance architect, Otto Wagner, among others, was a member of his studio. 1846–52 Förster worked with his son-in-law Theophil Freiherr von Hansen. He contributed to the Ringstraße. Berlin-educated Ignaz Wechselmann became his friend and assistant. Förster superintended the construction of the Dohány Street Synagogue in Budapest, which along with the Leopoldstädter Tempel and the Synagogue of Miskolc is his most important work. Forster and Hansen designed the structure - the largest synagogue in Europe - based on Byzantine-Moorish style as shown features such as the polychromic building with onion domes and arched gates. 

1861–63 he was a member of the Viennese city council (Gemeinderat).

Förster's sons, Heinrich and Emil, were also architects. The latter worked for his father and then for the government, completing the renovation of the Hofburg and Burgtheater.

Notable works 
 Theater Reduta, Bürgerhäuser, Brno (1831)
 Evangelische Kirche Gumpendorf (1849)
 Villa Pereira, Königstetten (1849)
 Arsenal, Vienna (1849-1856)
 Maria-Hilf-Kirche, Vienna (1854)
 Dohány Street Synagogue, Budapest (1854-1859)
 Augarten-Casino, Brno (1855)
 Leopoldstädter Tempel, Vienna (1858)
 Elisabethbrücke, Vienna (1858, demolished 1897)
 Synagogue of Miskolc, Miskolc, 1863 
 Palais Todesco, Vienna (1863)

References

External links 

 aeiou
 ÖBL

Austrian architects
Synagogue architecture
Austrian people of German descent
People from Ansbach
1797 births
1863 deaths
Academic staff of the Academy of Fine Arts Vienna